Basshunter is a Swedish singer, record producer and DJ, who has released six studio albums. His second studio album LOL released in 2006 earned him nominations for Emma and Grammis awards, and won the European Border Breakers Award. His single "Boten Anna" was nominated among others for Rockbjörnen award and won Eurodanceweb Award. "Now You're Gone" was nominated for MTV Europe Music Award in category Most Addictive Track, won Eska Music Award and was ranked 9th in voting for The Record of the Year. In 2008 Basshunter was nominated for BT Digital Music Award in category Best Electronic Artist or DJ and Breakthrough Artist of the Year.

In 2009 Basshunter received Scandipop Award which was his last distinction. His single "Every Morning" was nominated for International Dance Music Award in 2010. In 2011 he also received last nomination for Scandipop Award for his single "Saturday". Overall, Basshunter has received nine awards from 27 nominations.

Awards and nominations

Listicles

References

External links
 

Basshunter
Awards